Birna Berg Haraldsdóttir (born 1993) is an Icelandic team handball player for ÍBV and the Icelandic national team.

She participated at the 2011 World Women's Handball Championship in Brazil.

Playing career
On 10 May 2019, Birna signed with Neckarsulmer SU of the German Bundesliga. In May 2019, she suffered a concussion after being fouled directly after scoring from a penalty.

References

External links

1993 births
Living people
Birna Berg Haraldsdottir